Professor John C. Wood (born 1949) is a British mathematician working at the University of Leeds.  He is one of the leading experts on harmonic maps and harmonic morphisms in the field of differential geometry.

Wood is a coauthor of the monograph: Harmonic Morphisms Between Riemannian Manifolds.  This was published in 2003 and is still the standard text on the subject.

Wood earned his PhD from the University of Warwick in 1974, under the supervision of James Eells.

Plagiarism
Wood was at the centre of a plagiarism row with one of his former PhD students in 2011.

Publications

with Paul Baird: Harmonic Morphisms between Riemannian Manifolds, London Math. Society Monographs (N.S.), No. 29, Oxford University Press (2003)
Profile at Zentralblatt MATH

References

External links 
Home page at the University of Leeds
Festschrift in honour of Prof. John C. Wood on the occasion of his 60th birthday.
Alumnus Spurns PhD over Plagiarism Row

20th-century English  mathematicians
21st-century English mathematicians
1949 births
Living people
Academics of the University of Leeds